The women's 100 metres event at the 2001 Summer Universiade was held at the Workers Stadium in Beijing, China. The final took place on 27 and 28 August.

Medalists

Results

Heats
Wind:Heat 1: 0.0 m/s, Heat 2: 0.0 m/s, Heat 3: +1.3 m/s, Heat 4: +1.3 m/s, Heat 5: +1.7 m/s

Quarterfinals
Wind:Heat 1: ? m/s, Heat 2: -1.5 m/s, Heat 3: -1.4 m/s

Semifinals
Wind:Heat 1: -0.3 m/s, Heat 2: 0.0 m/s

Final
Wind : +1.1 m/s

References

Athletics at the 2001 Summer Universiade
2001 in women's athletics
2001